Samarasekera is a Sinhalese name and it may refer to 
 Athula Samarasekera, Sri Lankan cricketer
 Indira Samarasekera, Vice-chancellor of the University of Alberta
 Johanne Samarasekera, Sri Lankan cricketer
 Justin Samarasekera, Sri Lankan architect
 Senapala Samarasekera, Sri Lankan politician

Sinhalese surnames